The Islamic Association of China is the official government supervisory organ for Islam in the People's Republic of China. The association is overseen by the United Front Work Department of the Chinese Communist Party (CCP) following the State Administration for Religious Affairs' absorption into the United Front Work Department in 2018.

History
In July 1952, Muslim leaders Burhan Shahidi, Liu Geping, Saifuddin Azizi, Yang Jingren, Pu-sheng, Ma Jian, Pang Shiqian and Ma Yuhuai met in Beijing to discuss founding a Chinese Islamic association. The Islamic Association of China was established on May 11, 1953, as the  first unified national Islamic organization, designed to build bridges between all Chinese Muslims. At its inaugural meeting on May 11, 1953, in Beijing, representatives from 10 nationalities of the People's Republic of China were in attendance. Since its founding, there have been eight national conferences.

In 1955, the association established an Islamic college at Beijing that trains students to become religious professionals. In 1957, the Association began publishing a bi-monthly magazine targeted at Chinese Muslims. During the Cultural Revolution, the actives of the Association ceased but began again in 1979.

In 2018, the association's parent organization, the State Administration for Religious Affairs, was absorbed into the CCP's United Front Work Department.

Leaders
The incumbent president is Xilalunding Chen Guangyuan, and the vice-president is Juma Taier.

Past presidents are:
Shahidi
Muhammad Ali
Zhang Jie
Elias
Shen Hsia-hee
Saliha Shi-wei

See also

 Islam in China
 Islamophobia in China

References

External links

 

1953 establishments in China
Islamic organizations based in China
Islamic organizations established in 1953
Organizations associated with the Chinese Communist Party